Grant Broadcasters is an Australian regional radio network. Founded in 1942, by 2019 it owned 53 radio stations. In 2022 it sold 46 to Here, There & Everywhere retaining shareholdings in seven in Canberra, Geelong, Goulburn and Perth.

History
Grant Broadcasters was founded by Walter Grant in 1942 when he bought 2DU in Dubbo. In 1972 a shareholding in 2ST in Nowra was purchased followed in 1979 by 2PK in Parkes and in 1982 2MG in Mudgee. In 1986 2DU, 2PK and 2MG were sold with full ownership taken of 2ST. Over the next three decades, the company expanded through acquisition, purchasing radio stations in all states and territories of Australia, owning 53 stations by November 2021. In November 2021, Grant Broadcasters agreed terms to sell 46 stations to Here, There & Everywhere (HTE). The deal was finalised on 4 January 2022 with HTE integrating the stations purchased into its ARN Regional business. As part of the sale, Grant Broadcasters took a 12% shareholding in HTE.

Radio stations
Grant Broadcasters owns two radio stations outright:
Bay FM, Geelong
K Rock 95.5, Geelong

It also owns 50% in five stations in a joint venture with Capital Radio Network.
Eagle FM, Goulburn
2CA, Canberra
2CC, Canberra
GNFM, Goulburn
6IX, Perth

Investments
Here, There & Everywhere (12%)

References

External links
Company website

Australian radio networks
Companies based in Sydney
 
Mass media companies established in 1942
1942 establishments in Australia